Jericho Beach, known originally as iy'a'l'mexw in Squamish, a Vancouver beach, is located west of the seaside neighbourhood of Kitsilano. It is surrounded by Jericho Beach Park, a grassy area with a pond, which is a picnic destination. Jericho Beach is the home of the Jericho Sailing Centre Association.

Etymology  
The name Jericho Beach derives from Jeremiah Rogers, who ran a logging camp in the area in the 1860s, either as a corruption of "Jerry's Cove" or else as a corruption of his company's name, Jerry & Co.

Jericho Beach
The beach is home to concessions, soccer and baseball fields, picnic tables, public washrooms, among other amenities like beach volleyball nets. Also, there are lifeguards on duty for beach safety from late May to early September. 
It is home to the Jericho Works Yard for the Vancouver Parks Board, a youth hostel, the annual Vancouver Folk Music Festival and the Jericho Sailing Centre.

Jericho Beach Park
Jericho Beach Park is a park that is near Jericho Beach. The park includes a pond, a tennis court, and many picnic areas. Along with Locarno Beach Park (which is a park adjacent to Jericho Beach Park), Jericho Beach Park is home to many rabbits and other animals.

Jericho Beach Flying Boat Station

801 (Vancouver) Wing, Air Force Association of Canada; Air Crew Association (Vancouver Branch); Air Force Officers Association and the British Columbia Veterans Commemorative Association erected an educational monument at the Jericho Beach Flying Boat Station, 1920-1947. Jericho Beach was the first Canadian Air Force and, in 1924, the first Royal Canadian Air Force station in British Columbia. The old headquarters building is now used by 39 Canadian Brigade Group.

References

External links

 Film of Jericho Beach in the 1920s

Beaches of Vancouver
Festival venues in Canada